The International Forum for Information Technology in Tamil (INFITT, read In-Fit; Tamil: உலகத் தமிழ் தகவல் தொழில்நுட்ப மன்றம் (உத்தமம்)) is a non-profit, non-governmental nodal organization for collaboration among professionals, enthusiasts, government entities, and other international organizations working in the development and standardization of information technology for Tamil language. It has active liaison and collaboration with government entities in India, Sri Lanka, Singapore and Malaysia, and industry bodies like Unicode Consortium.

INFITT conducts regular technical conferences related to Tamil computing, which attract active participation from international researchers and professionals.  These Tamil Internet Conferences (aka TIC) are conducted in Tamil speaking countries like India, Singapore and Malaysia, or international institutions that pioneer in Tamil research. Past conferences have been organized in association with governments of Tamil Nadu and Malaysia, and universities of Singapore, California, Pennsylvania and Cologne.

History
There had been active interaction between various technology professionals and Tamil scholars over the internet well before the creation of INFITT. Some of this collaboration was in standardizing a keyboard layout more suited for computers, and defining an 8-bit encoding scheme to work on then current operating systems which didn't yet support Unicode. International technical workshops and conferences were already being conducted regularly, with patronage from government or universities. The idea of a formal international entity was mooted in private communications among key members preparing for Tamil Internet 2000 Conference and a constitution was drafted.  Establishment of the organization was announced during that conference with the participants of the conference forming the initial general body.

Tamil Internet Conferences
Tamil Internet Conferences bring together scholars and researchers working in Tamil Information Technology from across the world for active discussion and learning. The main aspect of the conferences are the technical section with paper presentations and group discussions.  Some conferences held in locations with significant Tamil population may also have two additional sections, namely, Public Gallery (மக்கள் அரங்கம்), and Exhibition.  Typically, participation in technical conferences only would require paid registration.

The gallery is used for showcasing recent developments in technology. Educational sessions and booths help the visiting public in enabling Tamil in their devices, and learn about job and business opportunities in Tamil computing.

The table below lists 3 precursor events conducted before the formation of INFITT, in the years 1997, 1999 and 2000.  INFITT was established during the conference in 2000, held in Singapore.

Working Groups
Working groups are the primary mode of coordination for technical discussion within INFITT.  Some of the working groups may be time bound and might close on completion of their objective, while others continue to function to facilitate ongoing discussions and developments.  There were a total of 8 working groups formed so far in INFITT.

Events & workshops
INFITT organizes educational workshops focused to specific target audience.  These workshops range from basic training in using computers in Tamil language, to advanced workshops on research topics.  These are often organized in coordination with colleges and universities.

Organizational structure
INFITT are governed by the 9-member executive committee (EC) which takes all major decisions.  It is headed by a chair who holds the office for a one-year term, who is assisted by a vice chair, executive director and a treasurer.  The EC is elected to hold office for a two-year term by the general council.

The general council consists of 54 elected members.  Members of GC are elected by the general body every two years.  GC has proportional representation for regions and countries with significant Tamil population. The general body consists of all registered members of the organization.

INFITT also has regional chapters for handling activities in specific regions.  Currently there are two active regional chapters in India and Malaysia.  There are also student chapters within major universities.

Membership
Membership of INFITT is open to individuals and organizations. Membership doesn't have any restrictions other than to abide by the rules of the organization and payment of annual membership fee.

Registered students may become members without paying any registration fee.  Student members will enjoy similar benefit as regular members except the voting rights in General Council elections.

Collaborations
INFITT regularly collaborates with various industry organizations and government bodies in setting standards, facilitating development and promoting usage.  INFITT is a liaison member of Unicode Consortium, and worked to develop the Unicode standard in Tamil language.

References

Tamil computing